Germanus of Constantinople may refer to:

 Germanus I of Constantinople, Ecumenical Patriarch in 715–730
 Germanus II of Constantinople, Ecumenical Patriarch in 1223–1240
 Germanus III of Constantinople, Ecumenical Patriarch in 1266
 Germanus IV of Constantinople, Ecumenical Patriarch in 1842–1845 and 1852–1853
 Germanus V of Constantinople, Ecumenical Patriarch in 1913–1918